The 2003–04 OHL season was the 24th season of the Ontario Hockey League. In November 2003, the OHL Board of Governors renamed the OHL Humanitarian of the Year Award to the Dan Snyder Memorial Trophy, in recognition of former Owen Sound Platers player, Dan Snyder, who died in a car accident in September 2003. Twenty teams each played 68 games. The J. Ross Robertson Cup was won by the Guelph Storm, who swept the Mississauga IceDogs in the league final.

Regular season

Final standings
Note: DIV = Division; GP = Games played; W = Wins; L = Losses; T = Ties; OTL = Overtime losses; GF = Goals for; GA = Goals against; PTS = Points; x = clinched playoff berth; y = clinched division title; z = clinched conference title

Eastern conference

Western conference

Scoring leaders

Playoffs

Conference quarterfinals

Eastern conference

Western conference

Conference semifinals

Conference finals

J. Ross Robertson Cup finals

J. Ross Robertson Cup Champions Roster

All-Star teams

First team
Corey Locke, Centre, Ottawa 67's
Wojtek Wolski, Left Wing, Brampton Battalion
Corey Perry, Right Wing, London Knights
James Wisniewski, Defence, Plymouth Whalers
Dennis Wideman, Defence, London Knights
Paulo Colaiacovo, Goaltender, Barrie Colts
Dale Hunter, Coach, London Knights

Second team
Jeff Carter, Centre, Sault Ste. Marie Greyhounds
Scott Dobben, Left Wing, Sault Ste. Marie Greyhounds
Stefan Ruzicka, Right Wing, Owen Sound Attack
Andre Benoit, Defence, Kitchener Rangers
Jeremy Swanson, Defence, Barrie Colts
Patrick Ehelechner, Goaltender, Sault Ste. Marie Greyhounds
Greg Gilbert, Coach, Mississauga IceDogs

Third team
Martin St. Pierre, Centre, Guelph Storm
Dylan Hunter, Left Wing, London Knights
David Bolland, Right Wing, London Knights
Chris Campoli, Defence, Erie Otters
Kevin Klein, Defence, Guelph Storm
David Shantz, Goaltender, Mississauga IceDogs
Shawn Camp, Coach, Guelph Storm

CHL Canada/Russia Series
In the RE/MAX Canada-Russia Challenge, the OHL All-stars defeated the Russian Selects 7–1 at London, Ontario, on November 17, and the OHL All-stars defeated the Russian Selects 4–0 at Sarnia, Ontario, on November 19.

Awards

2004 OHL Priority Selection
On May 1, 2004, the OHL conducted the 2004 Ontario Hockey League Priority Selection. The Belleville Bulls held the first overall pick in the draft, and selected John Hughes from the Whitby Wildcats. Hughes was awarded the Jack Ferguson Award, awarded to the top pick in the draft.

Below are the players who were selected in the first round of the 2004 Ontario Hockey League Priority Selection.

2004 CHL Import Draft
On June 30, 2004, the Canadian Hockey League conducted the 2004 CHL Import Draft, in which teams in all three CHL leagues participate in. The Owen Sound Attack held the first pick in the draft by a team in the OHL, and selected Andrej Sekera from the Slovakia with their selection.

Below are the players who were selected in the first round by Ontario Hockey League teams in the 2004 CHL Import Draft.

See also
List of OHA Junior A standings
List of OHL seasons
2004 Memorial Cup
2004 NHL Entry Draft
2003 in sports
2004 in sports

References

HockeyDB

Ontario Hockey League seasons
OHL